Jozef Kožlej (born 8 July 1973) is a Slovak retired professional footballer who played as a forward. He played in Czechoslovakia, Germany, Greece and Cyprus.

Club career
Born in Stropkov, Kožlej began playing youth football for Tesla Stropkov and 1. FC Tatran Prešov. He is well known for his excellent goal-scoring ability and holds the all-time record among Slovak footballers.

He scored Larissa's first goal in the 2007 Greek Cup Final against Panathinaikos with a great header; Larissa won 2–1 with the second goal being scored by Henry Antchouet. He arguably spent his most productive seasons in terms of goals scored at Olympiakos Nicosia and has returned to this club to finish his career which occurred in the end of January 2010.

International career
Kožlej appeared in 26 matches for the senior Slovakia national football team from 1996 to 2005.

Honours
AEL
 Greek Cup: 2006–07

References

External links

Profile at JFK-Fotbal

1973 births
Living people
Slovak footballers
Slovakia international footballers
Slovak expatriate footballers
1. FC Tatran Prešov players
AC Sparta Prague players
FC Hradec Králové players
FK Viktoria Žižkov players
FC VSS Košice players
SpVgg Greuther Fürth players
Olympiakos Nicosia players
AC Omonia players
Anorthosis Famagusta F.C. players
Athlitiki Enosi Larissa F.C. players
Thrasyvoulos F.C. players
Czech First League players
Slovak Super Liga players
Super League Greece players
Cypriot First Division players
Expatriate footballers in Cyprus
Expatriate footballers in Greece
Expatriate footballers in Germany

Association football forwards
People from Stropkov
Sportspeople from the Prešov Region